Ángel Ibáñez (born 3 January 1939) is a Spanish former cyclist, who was professional between 1962 and 1969. In the 1967 Vuelta a España, Ibáñez won the 13th stage and finished 41st overall. Finally, Angel Ibáñez manages to reach the foot of the Basilica of El Pilar two and a half minutes before the dozen pursuers who, in turn, lead the great platoon in thirty-eight seconds more. Competed in Vallmoll near Tarragona for 80 kilometers, Ángel Ibáñez won with more than three minutes ahead of his closest pursuers.

Biography
Ángel Ibáñez was born in Bárboles, Aragon on January 3, 1939. Ángel Ibáñez started in Torredembarra in 1959. As an amateur Ángel Ibáñez was the amateur 1961, 1964 and mountain 1961 champion of Catalonia, and the provincial champion 1963-65. Ibáñez competed professionally with the Ferrys team from 1966-68 and Pepsi-Cola in 1969. Ángel Ibáñez was champion of Spain by region 1968 and won a stage of the Vuelta a Andalucía 1966, the Vuelta a España 1967, the Euskal Bizikleta 1967 and the race of San Salvador del Valle 1968. Ángel Ibáñez contested four Vueltas a España 1966-69 and a Tour de France 1967. The modest Aragonese Angel Ibáñez, from the Ferrys team, undertakes a solo adventure, a crazy chimera, when just four kilometers of race have been covered.

Major results

1962
3rd Trofeo Jaumendreu
1964
 1st GP Catalunya
1965
 1st Trofeo Borras
 7th Trofeo Masferrer
1966
 1st Overall Vuelta a Mallorca
 8th Overall Vuelta a Andalucía
1st Stage 3
1967
 1st Stage 13 Vuelta a España
 6th Overall Euskal Bizikleta
1st Stage 1
1968
 9th Overall Volta a Catalunya

Grand Tour results

Tour de France
 1967: 48

Vuelta a España
 1966: DNF
 1967: 41
 1968: DNF
 1969: 50

References

External links
 

 
1939 births
Living people
Spanish male cyclists
Sportspeople from the Province of Zaragoza
Cyclists from Aragon